Bastián Felipe Solano Molina (born 16 June 1999) is a Chilean footballer who plays for Fernández Vial.

References

External links
 

1999 births
Living people
People from Melipilla Province
Chilean footballers
Chilean Primera División players
Primera B de Chile players
C.D. Huachipato footballers
Deportes Melipilla footballers
C.D. Arturo Fernández Vial footballers
Association football defenders